Creative City (aka Fujairah Creative City – FCC) is a media free zone government-owned company in Fujairah, United Arab Emirates.

Overview
FCC was launched by Fujairah Media as an alternative to Dubai Media City, aims to attract regional and international broadcast TV and radio providers to Fujairah in the United Arab Emirates, while also providing creative media-related services.

The first phase of the development secured USD50 million. The free zone will be a  complex and will be located alongside the Sheikh Khalifa Highway, in turn connecting it to the Emirates Road leading to Dubai. The first phase was completed in 2007.

The following types of licenses will be available in Fujairah Creative City:

 Publishing
 Management of broadcasting
 Marketing and Media Services
 Music and Entertainment
 Consultancy
 Broadcasting
 Production/Post production/Filming
 Information Technology Services

See also
 Fujairah Free Zone

References

2005 establishments in the United Arab Emirates
Companies established in 2005
Free-trade zones of the United Arab Emirates
Emirati film studios
Government-owned companies of the United Arab Emirates
Companies based in the Emirate of Fujairah
Economy of the Emirate of Fujairah
Geography of the Emirate of Fujairah
Fujairah City